The Sloan Morpeth Trophy was an amateur team golf tournament, played between Australia and New Zealand. It was contested irregularly from 1947 to 2016. The trophy was presented by Sloan Morpeth in 1956. From 1993 to 2005 the two countries played each other as part of the Four Nations Team Championship, a competition which also involved Canada and Japan, while from 2007 to 2012 it was played as part of the Trans Tasman Cup. In 2016 the trophy was contested using scores from the two qualifying rounds of the Australian Amateur.

Format
Except for the final event in 2016, the tournament was match-play. The size of the teams and the format varied but consisted of a combination of foursomes and singles matches. In 2016 the teams had four players with the best three scores from two stroke-play rounds counting towards the team total.

Results

Source:

Teams

Australia
1947 Bob Brown, Alex Colledge, Bill Edgar, Keith Pix
1948 Doug Bachli, Bill Edgar, Harry Hattersley, Alan Waterson
1952 Bill Ackland-Horman, Harry Berwick, Jack Coogan, Bob Stevens
1953 Harry Berwick, Jack Coogan, Peter Heard, Bob Stevens
1956 Harry Berwick, Bill Edgar, Justin Seward, Peter Toogood
1961 Phil Billings, Vic Bulgin, Tom Crow, John Hood, Eric Routley, Bob Stevens
1964 Barrie Baker, Phil Billings, Tom Crow, Kevin Hartley
1965 Dennis Bell, Phil Billings, Tom Crow, Kevin Donohoe, Kevin Hartley, Neil Titheridge
1966 Harry Berwick, Phil Billings, Kevin Donohoe, Kevin Hartley
1967 Dennis Bell, Phil Billings, Bill Britten, Vic Bulgin, Kevin Donohoe, Kevin Hartley
1969 Barry Burgess, Kevin Donohoe, Terry Gale, Tony Gresham, Kevin Hartley, Sommie Mackay, Jack Newton, Peter Toogood
1976 Chris Bonython, Tony Gresham, Colin Kaye, Phil Wood
1977 Clyde Boyer, Tony Gresham, Peter Sweeney, Phil Wood
1980 Tony Gresham, John Kelly, Jeff Senior, Peter Sweeney
1982 Eric Couper, Roger Mackay, Ossie Moore, Peter Sweeney
1983 Eric Couper, Wayne Smith, Peter Sweeney, Chris Tatt
1984 Neil Crafter, Tony Dight, Chris Tatt, Jeff Wagner
1986 Brad King, Peter O'Malley, Ray Picker, Gerard Power
1987 David Ecob, Brett Johns, Mike Sammells, Stephen Taylor
1988 David Ecob, Bradley Hughes, Brett Johns, Lester Peterson
1990 Robert Allenby, Steven Conran, Chris Gray, Lester Peterson
1991 Robert Allenby, Stephen Leaney, Lester Peterson, John Wade
1992 Stuart Appleby, David Armstrong, Steve Collins, Stephen Leaney, Lucas Parsons, Lester Peterson
2007 Andrew Dodt, Richie Gallichan, Rick Kulacz, Tim Stewart
2008 Scott Arnold, Matthew Griffin, Jason Scrivener, John Younger
2009 Luke Bleumink, Matt Jager, Ryan McCarthy, Brendan Smith
2010 Daniel Beckmann, Kieran Pratt, Jason Scrivener, Jordan Sherratt
2012 Jake Higginbottom, Nathan Holman, Ryan McCarthy, Cameron Smith
2016 Brett Coletta, Cameron John, Min Woo Lee, Zach Murray

Source:

New Zealand
1947 Bob Glading, Guy Horne, Bryan Silk, Tim Woon
1948 Bob Glading, John Hornabrook, Bryan Silk, Tim Woon
1952 Tony Gibbs, Guy Horne, Bryan Silk, Tim Woon
1953 Tom Jeffery, Stuart Jones, Sid McDonald, Tim Woon
1956 Bob Charles, Stuart Jones, Bryan Silk, Tim Woon
1961 Walter Godfrey, Frank Gordon, Stuart Jones, Ross Murray, Ross Newdick, Ian Woodbury
1964 John Durry, Stuart Jones, Ted McDougall, Ross Murray
1965 John Durry, Stuart Jones, John Means, Ted McDougall, Ross Murray, Ian Woodbury
1966 John Durry, Stuart Jones, Ross Murray, Bruce Stevens
1967 Geoff Clarke, John Durry, Stuart Jones, Ross Murray, Bruce Stevens, Boris Vezich
1969 G.D. Brown, Geoff Clarke, John Durry, Stuart Jones, Ted McDougall, Ross Murray, Bruce Rafferty, Bruce Stevens
1976 Alex Bonnington, Peter Burney, Geoff Clarke, Ted McDougall
1977 Alex Bonnington, Geoff Clarke, Paul Hartstone, Mike Nicholson
1980 Michael Barltrop, Geoff Clarke, Paul Hartstone, Colin Taylor
1982 Michael Barltrop, Paul Hartstone, Colin Taylor, Tony Treen
1983 Michael Barltrop, Terry Cochrane, Jim Lapsley, Colin Taylor
1984 Michael Barltrop, Terry Cochrane, Brent Paterson, Colin Taylor
1986 Michael Barltrop, Terry Cochrane, Owen Kendall, Brent Paterson
1987 Phil Aickin, Michael Barltrop, Owen Kendall, Brent Paterson
1988 Phil Aickin, Michael Barltrop, Owen Kendall, Brent Paterson
1990 Phil Aickin,  Steven Alker, Michael Long, Grant Moorhead
1991 Steven Alker, Tony Christie, Grant Moorhead, Stephen Scahill
1992 Steven Alker, Michael Campbell, Tony Christie, Saali Herewini, Grant Moorhead, Stephen Scahill
2007 James Gill, Danny Lee, Troy Ropiha, Andrew Searle
2008 Nick Gillespie, Danny Lee, Daniel Pearce, Jared Pender
2009 Ryan Fox, Daniel Pearce, Sean Riordan, Peter Spearman-Burn
2010 Ben Campbell, Ryan Fox, Nick Gillespie, Andy Stewart
2012 Ben Campbell, Vaughn McCall, Mathew Perry, Blair Riordan
2016 Ryan Chisnall, Nick Coxon, Daniel Hillier, Luke Toomey

Source:

See also
Tasman Cup
Trans Tasman Cup

References

Amateur golf tournaments
Team golf tournaments
Golf tournaments in Australia
Golf tournaments in New Zealand
Recurring sporting events established in 1947
Recurring sporting events disestablished in 2016